Cesare Colombo (1889–1945) was an Italian tennis player. He competed in the men's singles and doubles events at the 1920 Summer Olympics.

References

External links
 

1889 births
1945 deaths
Italian male tennis players
Olympic tennis players of Italy
Tennis players at the 1920 Summer Olympics
People from La Spezia
Sportspeople from the Province of La Spezia
20th-century Italian people